Con Amor (Spanish "with love") may refer to:

Music

Albums
Con Amor, album by Tito Rojas
Con Amor, album by Los Yonic's 1984
Con Amor, album by Richard Clayderman 2000
Con Amor, album by Carlos Greco / Matt Monro 2007
Con Amor: Tus Exitos Favoritos, Menudo 1984
Con Amor Eterno Pandora (band) 1991
Con Amor, album by Alberto Vazquez (singer)
Con Amor, album by Los Terricolas 2008
Con Amor, album by Chucho Avellanet 1993
Con Tu Amor (album) Juan Gabriel 1992
Con Tanto Amor La Mafia 1990

Songs
"Con Amor" by Ricardo Montaner Composed by Ricardo Montaner
"Con Amor", song by John Du Prez	Jaymes, Du Prez 1983
"Con Amor" by Los Bukis Composed by Marco Antonio Solís